Midday prayer may refer to:

Sext, a fixed time of prayer of the Divine Office
Zuhr prayer, the Islamic midday prayer.